Mandrake is a 1979 American television thriller film directed by Harry Falk and starring Anthony Herrera, Simone Griffeth, Ji-Tu Cumbuka, Gretchen Corbett, Peter Haskell, and Robert Reed. Based on the comic strip Mandrake the Magician, the film follows a magician attempting to help an amusement park owner who is being blackmailed by a psychopath who is murdering guests.

Premise
The film follows Mandrake, a magician, and his assistant Lothar, who attempt to help an amusement park proprietor being blackmailed by a psychopath who is murdering the park's customers.

Cast

Release

Critical response
Tom Buckley of The New York Times panned the film, writing that "Rick Husky's script for this Universal Television presentation is a compilation of cliches. Harry Falks's direction is plodding. However, viewers can try a magic trick of their own. By turning the dial, they can make Mandrake disappear".

References

External links

1979 films
1970s thriller films
American thriller films
American television films
Films about magic and magicians
Films based on American comics
Films based on comic strips
Films set in amusement parks
Films directed by Harry Falk (director)
1970s American films